The Twins' Girl Power is the Olympic-themed album released in June 2004.  It comes in a special edition package.  Included are:

Six mini posters measuring 15" x 20"
Twins Effect 2 beverage coaster
Lucky draw scratch-and-win card for the music VCD

Similar to their previous albums, this album is larger than usual, using a large cardboard book-like package to carry the AVCD and posters.  There are six different colored fabric bands wrapped around the package.  Included is the theme song for Twins Effect II, 爱无敌 (Love is Invincible, track 07.)

Track listing
Computer Data 
拍住上 MV 
女人味 (Girl Power)
約會自己 (Dating Myself)
受之有愧 
施比愛 
愛無敵 (Love Knows No Enemies) - theme song for Twins Effect II
07奧運 (07 Olympics)
丟架 
安全感 (Sense of Security)
美麗無比 (Incomparable Beauty)
烈女 
拍住上

2004 albums
Twins (group) albums